Hans Albrecht (born 7 September 1924) is a Swiss former sports shooter. He competed at the 1960 Summer Olympics and the 1964 Summer Olympics.

References

External links
 

1924 births
Possibly living people
Swiss male sport shooters
Olympic shooters of Switzerland
Shooters at the 1960 Summer Olympics
Shooters at the 1964 Summer Olympics
People from Dielsdorf District
Sportspeople from the canton of Zürich